This is a list of California Department of Fish and Wildlife protected areas. The California Department of Fish and Wildlife (CDFW), through its seven regional divisions, manages 262 protected areas statewide. This agency was formerly known as the California Department of Fish and Game (CDFG).

Types
The protected areas are broadly categorized as:
 Wildlife areas
 Ecological reserves
 Marine protected areas — under the 1999 Marine Life Protection Act

List of DFG protected areas 

* Indicates protected area status will come into effect on September 21, 2007.

References 
 
 
 
 

.
California Department of Fish and Game protected areas

California DFW